The 64th Cannes Film Festival was held from 11 to 22 May 2011. American actor Robert De Niro served as the president of the jury for the main competition and French filmmaker Michel Gondry headed the jury for the short film competition. South Korean film director Bong Joon-ho was the head of the jury for the Caméra d'Or prize, which is awarded to the best first-time filmmaker. The American film The Tree of Life, directed by Terrence Malick won the Palme d'Or.

Midnight in Paris, written and directed by Woody Allen, opened the festival and Beloved (Les Bien-aimés), directed by Christophe Honoré and screened as out of competition, closed the festival. Mélanie Laurent hosted the opening and closing ceremonies.

Italian film director Bernardo Bertolucci was presented with the third Honorary Palme d'Or Award at the opening ceremony of the festival. Though the award had been given out sporadically in the past the Honorary Palme d'Or was supposed to presented annually after 2011. However it was not given again until the 2015 Cannes Film Festival. Gus Van Sant's Restless opened the Un Certain Regard section. Jailed Iranian film directors Jafar Panahi and Mohammad Rasoulof were honoured at the festival. Goodbye by Rasoulof and Panahi's This Is Not a Film was screened at the festival, and Panahi was awarded the Carrosse d'Or. Four female directors featured in the main competition: Australian Julia Leigh, Japan's Naomi Kawase, Scottish director Lynne Ramsay and France's own Maïwenn Le Besco.

Danish film director Lars von Trier caused controversy with comments he made at the press conference of his film Melancholia. When he was asked about the relation between the influences of German Romanticism in the film and his own German heritage, the director made jokes about Jews and Nazis. He said he understood Adolf Hitler and admired the work of architect Albert Speer, and jokingly announced that he was a Nazi. The Cannes Film Festival first issued an official apology for the remarks the same day and clarified that Trier is not a Nazi or an antisemite, then declared the director "persona non grata" the following day. The film remained in competition.

Juries

Main competition
The following people were appointed as the Jury for the feature films of the 2010 Official Selection:
 Robert De Niro (American actor) Jury President
 Jude Law, (English actor)
 Uma Thurman (American actress)
 Martina Gusmán (Argentine actress and producer)
 Nansun Shi (Hong Kong producer)
 Linn Ullmann (Norwegian critic and writer)
 Olivier Assayas (French director)
 Mahamat-Saleh Haroun (Chadian director)
 Johnnie To (Hong Kong director and producer)

Un Certain Regard
 Emir Kusturica (Serbian director) President
 Élodie Bouchez (French actress)
 Peter Bradshaw (British critic)
 Geoffrey Gilmore (American Creative Director of Tribeca Enterprises)
 Daniela Michel (Mexican director of the Morelia Festival)

Cinéfondation and short films
 Michel Gondry (French director) President
 Julie Gayet (French actress and producer)
 Jessica Hausner (Austrian director and producer)
 Corneliu Porumboiu (Romanian director)
 João Pedro Rodrigues (Portuguese director)

Camera d'Or
 Bong Joon-ho (South Korean director) President
 Danièle Heymann (French critic)
 Eva Vezer (Hungarian Head of Magyar Filmunio)
 Robert Alazraki (French cinematographer)
 Daniel Colland (French manager of Cinedia laboratory)
 Jacques Maillot (French director)
 Alex Masson (French critic)

Independent Juries
The following independent jury awarded films in the frame of the International Critics' Week.

Nespresso Grand Prize	
 Lee Chang-dong (South Korean film director) President
 Scott Foundas (American film critic)
 Nick James (English film critic)
 Sergio Wolf (Argentinian film critic and curator)
 Cristina Piccino (Italian film critic)

Official selection

In competition - Feature films
The following feature films competed for the Palme d'Or. The Palme d'Or winner has been highlighted.

(CdO) indicates film eligible for the Caméra d'Or as directorial debut feature.

Un Certain Regard
The following films were selected for the competition of Un Certain Regard. The Prix un certain regard winners have been highlighted.

(CdO) indicates film eligible for the Caméra d'Or as directorial debut feature.

Out of Competition
The following films were selected to be screened out of competition:

(CdO) indicates film eligible for the Caméra d'Or as directorial debut feature.

Special screenings
The following films were shown as special screenings.

(CdO) indicates film eligible for the Caméra d'Or as directorial debut feature.

Cinéfondation
The following films were selected to be screened in the Cinéfondation section, which focuses on short films made by students at film schools. The winner of the Cinéfondation First Prize has been highlighted.

Short films 
The following short films competed for the Short Film Palme d'Or. The Short film Palme d'Or winner has been highlighted.

Cannes Classics
The following films were selected to be screened in the Cannes Classics section.

(CdO) indicates film eligible for the Caméra d'Or as directorial debut feature.

Cinéma de la Plage
The Cinéma de la Plage is a part of the Official Selection of the festival. The outdoors screenings at the beach cinema of Cannes are open to the public.

Parallel Sections

International Critics' Week
The line-up for the International Critics' Week was announced on 18 April at the section's website. Declaration of War, directed by Valérie Donzelli, and Bachelor Days Are Over, directed by Katia Lewkowicz, were selected as the opening and closing films of the Semaine de la Critique section.

Feature films

(CdO) indicates film eligible for the Caméra d'Or as directorial debut feature.

Short films

Special screenings

(CdO) indicates film eligible for the Caméra d'Or as directorial debut feature.

Directors' Fortnight
The following films were selected to be screened in the independent Directors' Fortnight section:

Feature films

(CdO) indicates film eligible for the Caméra d'Or as directorial debut feature.

Special Screenings

Short films

Awards

Official awards
The Palme d'Or was won by the American film The Tree of Life directed by Terrence Malick. Two of the film's producers, Bill Pohlad and Sarah Green, accepted the prize on behalf of the reclusive Malick. The Tree of Life is the first American film to win the Palme d'Or since Fahrenheit 9/11 in 2004. Head of the jury, Robert De Niro, said it was difficult to choose a winner, but The Tree of Life "ultimately fit the bill". De Niro explained, "It had the size, the importance, the intention, whatever you want to call it, that seemed to fit the prize."

The following films and people received the 2011 Official selection awards:

In Competition
 Palme d'Or: The Tree of Life by Terrence Malick
 Grand Prix: Once Upon a Time in Anatolia by Nuri Bilge Ceylan and The Kid with a Bike by Jean-Pierre and Luc Dardenne
 Best Director Award: Nicolas Winding Refn for Drive
 Best Screenplay Award: Footnote by Joseph Cedar
 Best Actress Award: Kirsten Dunst for Melancholia
 Best Actor Award: Jean Dujardin for The Artist
 Prix du Jury: Polisse by Maïwenn
Un Certain Regard
 Prix Un Certain Regard: Arirang by Kim Ki-duk and Stopped on Track by Andreas Dresen
 Un Certain Regard Jury Prize: Elena by Andrey Zvyagintsev
 Un Certain Regard Best Director Award: Mohammad Rasoulof for Goodbye
Cinéfondation
 1st Prize: The Letter by Doroteya Droumeva
 2nd Prize: Drari by Kamal Nazraq
 3rd Prize: Fly by Night by Son Tae-gyum
Golden Camera
 Camera d'Or: Las Acacias by Pablo Giorgelli
Short films
 Short Film Palme d'Or: Cross by Marina Vroda
 Short Film Jury Prize: Swimsuit 46 by Wannes Destoop

Independent awards
FIPRESCI Prizes
 Le Havre by Aki Kaurismäki (In Competition)
 The Minister by Pierre Schöller (Un Certain Regard)
 Take Shelter by Jeff Nichols (Critics' Week)

Vulcan Award of the Technical Artist
 Vulcan Award: José Luis Alcaine (cinematography) for The Skin I Live In (La piel que habito)

Ecumenical Jury
 Prize of the Ecumenical Jury: This Must Be the Place by Paolo Sorrentino
 Prize of the Ecumenical Jury - Special Mention: Le Havre by Aki Kaurismäki & Where Do We Go Now? by Nadine Labaki

Awards in the frame of International Critics' Week
 Critics Week Nespresso Grand Prize: Take Shelter by Jeff Nichols
 Special Mention from the Jury President: Snowtown by Justin Kurzel
 Prix SACD: Take Shelter by Jeff Nichols
 ACID/CCAS Prize: Las Acacias by Pablo Giorgelli
 Very Young Critics Prize: Las Acacias by Pablo Giorgelli

Awards in the frame of Directors' Fortnight
 International Confederation of Art Cinemas: The Giants by Bouli Lanners
 Prix SACD: The Giants by Bouli Lanners

Association Prix François Chalais
 Prix François Chalais: Where Do We Go Now? (Halla' Lawein?) by Nadine Labaki

Queer Palm
 Queer Palm Award: Beauty by Oliver Hermanus

Palm Dog
 Palm Dog Award: Uggy for The Artist
 Special Jury Prize: Laika for Le Havre

References

External links

Official website Retrospective 2011 
64ème Festival de Cannes, cinema-francais.fr
Cannes Film Festival:2011 at Internet Movie Database
Cannes Film Festival 2011 – Radio France Internationale

Cannes Film Festival
Cannes Film Festival
Cannes Film Festival
Cannes Film Festival